Ernst Wilhelm Adalbert Kuhn (7 February 1846, in Berlin – 21 August 1920, in Munich) was a German Indologist and Indo-Europeanist. He was the son of philologist Adalbert Kuhn.

He studied at the universities of Berlin and  Tübingen, receiving his doctorate in 1869 with a dissertation-thesis on Kaccāyana, the grammarian, Kaccâyanappakaraṇae specimen. In 1871 he obtained his habilitation for Sanskrit and comparative grammar at the University of Halle, and during the following year relocated to Leipzig as a lecturer. In 1875, he became a full professor at the University of Heidelberg, and from 1877 to 1917 served as a professor of Aryan philology and comparative Indo-European linguistics at the University of Munich.

From 1873 he worked on the Zeitschrift für vergleichende Sprachforschung, a journal founded by his father, and since 1892 was an editor of Orientalische Bibliographie, a publication founded by August Müller in 1887. In 1883 he became a member of the Bavarian Academy of Sciences.

Selected works 
 Ueber die sprache der Etrusker (with Wilhelm Paul Corssen; 2 volumes, 1874–75) – On the language of the Etruscans.
 Beiträge zur Pali-grammatik, 1875 – Contributions to Pali grammar / considered to be his best work.
 Mythologische studien von Adalbert Kuhn (1886, as editor) – Mythological studies of Adalbert Kuhn.
 Barlaam und Joasaph; eine bibliographisch-literargeschichtliche Studie, 1894 – Barlaam and Josaphat; a bibliographical-literary-historical study / In this work Kuhn pointed out the Buddhist influence on Christian legends.
 Grundriss der iranischen philologie (as editor; main author Wilhelm Geiger) – Outline of Iranian philology.

References 

1846 births
1920 deaths
Writers from Berlin
Humboldt University of Berlin alumni
University of Tübingen alumni
Academic staff of Heidelberg University
Academic staff of the Ludwig Maximilian University of Munich
Linguists from Germany
German Indologists
German philologists
Iranologists